Love Me Or Leave Me is a 2012 to 2013 Taiwanese television series created and developed by SETTV. It stars Ann Hsu, Chris Wang as the main leads with Albee Huang, Lee Kang-i and Alan Kuo as the supporting cast. Filming began on September 16, 2012 and finished on February 17, 2013. It began airing on SETTV ETTV on November 8, 2012. Final episode aired on February 21, 2013 with 16 episodes total for the original Taiwan broadcast and 29 episodes for the Mainland China and Hong Kong version.

Synopsis
Ji Qing (Ann Hsu) has commitment issues due to her parents' failed marriage and her father's infidelity. Even though she is in a stable and loving relationship with her longtime boyfriend Fang Hao Ming (Chris Wang), she hesitates when he talks about marriage. To test if Hao Ming will remain faithful to her, she hires Zhao Shan Shan (Albee Huang) to test if he will cheat on her. Ji Qing's plan seems to backfire when Shan Shan seems to have fallen for Hao Ming for real.

Cast

Main Cast
Ann Hsu as Ji Qing 
Chris Wang as Fang Hao Ming 
Albee Huang as Zhao Shan Shan 
Lee Kang-i  as Liao Yi Ren 
Alan Ko as Ding Sheng Hua

Supporting cast
Chen De Lie as Wang Da Shuai 
Dou Dou as Wang Dou Dou 
Elaine Wan as Fang Yong Xin 
Tao Chuan Zheng as Ji Shi Xian 
Lin Xiu Jun as Mrs. Fang 
Lin Shu Yu as Zhuang Xiao Xian
Lin Mei-hsiu as Zeng Hai Ling

Soundtrack
All for You 都給你 by Chris Wang 
Miss Right 宥勝 by Chris Wang 
Happiness Is Like 幸福就好 by Soo Wincci 
I'll Be Alright 過得去 by Soo Wincci 
The Invisible Man 隱形人 by Yuan Chengjie 
So you 就這樣嗎 by By2
Love To Pick On 愛情來找碴 by By2
Not A Person 不是一個人 by Jeanie Zhang

Production team

Produced from the same team that produced SETTV 2011 to 2012 hit Taiwan romance drama "Inborn Pair". Hoping to strike double rating success with their "Inborn Pair" leads, Annie Chen and Chris Wang was then split up to film two different new romance dramas to be aired back to back. Chris Wang was paired up with Ann Hsu to film "Love Me Or Leave Me". While Annie Chen was paired up with George Hu to film "Love, Now". Both dramas started filming at the same time. "Love Me Or Leave Me" is Ann Hsu's first drama as the lead actress after many years of playing supporting roles in Taiwanese dramas.

Producer: 
Fang Xiaoren 方孝仁
Rong Junyi 戎俊義
Screenwriter: 
Ye Feng Ying 葉鳳英
Directed by: 
Lin Qing Zhen 林清振
Production Company: 
Golden Bloom Production Co., Ltd. 金牌風華影像製作股份有限公司

Broadcast

Episode ratings

Awards
48th Golden Bell Awards - Best Supporting Actress In A Drama
Albee Huang - Nominated

References

External links
 TTV Official website
 ETTV Official website 
 Official Facebook page 

Eastern Television original programming
Sanlih E-Television original programming
2012 Taiwanese television series debuts
2013 Taiwanese television series endings
Taiwanese romance television series